This article lists the diplomatic mission in Ghana. The capital Accra currently hosts 67 embassies/high commissions, while Kumasi hosts one consulate.

Diplomatic missions in Accra

Embassies/High Commissions 
Entries marked with an asterisk (*) are member-states of the Commonwealth of Nations. As such, their embassies are formally termed as "high commissions".

*
*

*

*

*

*

*

*

*

*

*
*

*

*

*

Other missions or delegations 
 (delegation)

Gallery

Consulate-General in Kumasi

Non-Resident Embassies and High Commissions 
Unless mentioned, the "city of residence" of following embassies/high commissions are in Abuja, Nigeria

 (Abidjan)
 (Abidjan)
 (Windhoek)

 (London)
 (Cairo)

 (Abuja)

 (Algiers)
 (Tripoli)
 (Dakar)
 (Addis Ababa)
 (Addis Ababa)
 (Algiers)

 (Singapore)

 (Pretoria)

 (Algiers)

Closed missions

See also 
 List of diplomatic missions of Ghana
 Foreign relations of Ghana
 List of Ambassadors and High Commissioners of Ghana
 Visa requirements for Ghanaian citizens

References

External links 
 Ministry of Foreign Affairs of Ghana
 Heads of diplomatic missions in Ghana
 Diplomatic Missions in Ghana

Ghana

Diplomatic missions